Sohanveer Singh (born 4 October 1950) is an Indian politician. He belongs to the Bharatiya Janata Party. He was a member of the 11th Lok Sabha representing the Muzaffarnagar (Lok Sabha constituency).

Early life and education
Sohanveer Singh obtained BSC and LLB Degree from DAV College Muzaffarnagar. Later He started working as Advocate in Muzaffarnagar bar council.

Political career
Sohanveer Singh started his political career as a member of Bharatiya Kranti Dal in 1969. Later he worked in Lok Dal after 1980.
He joined BJP in 1991. In 1996 with the help of Malti Sharma he succeed in securing the ticket from Muzaffarnagar (Lok Sabha constituency).

Singh contested and won elections in 1996 and 1998 by defeating Sanjay Singh Chauhan and Harendra Singh Malik of Samajwadi Party respectively.

Singh failed to register his third win hat trick and lost by Congress candidate S. Saiduzzaman by nearly 26,000 votes.

References 

1950 births
Living people
Bharatiya Janata Party politicians from Uttar Pradesh
India MPs 1996–1997
India MPs 1998–1999
People from Muzaffarnagar